Zachary Granger Moldof (born July 22, 1981), better known by his stage name Zachg, is an American hip hop artist based in Los Angeles, California. He is a founder of the lifestyle collective Rad Reef, which released the New No Wave compilation in 2013. He is one half of the design duo Twin Beast. He has collaborated with Main Attrakionz, Jel, Silky Johnson, Black Noise, BK Beats, Left Leberra, and Dizzy D, among others.

Life and career
Zachg, who is Jewish, is originally from Broward County, Florida and grew up in the Everglades. He attended University of Central Florida for advertising. He examined the roots of sampling in hip hop with his master's thesis at New York University Tisch School of the Arts.

Zachg was featured on "Hyperbolic Chamber Music", a 22-minute track produced by Ryan Hemsworth, along with other rappers such as Kool A.D., Lakutis, Isaiah Toothtaker, and Shady Blaze. He was also featured on "Hyperbolic Chamber Music II", which was produced by Steel Tipped Dove.

In 2012, Zachg released Cloudlife, a collaborative EP with Main Attrakionz and Jel. It was described by Fact as "an unusually focused release" from Main Attrakionz. He produced "J Bar" and "Take Her Shoppin" off of the EP. In that year, he also released Raindancin (in the Pussy), as well as Mostly Power and Mostly Peace.

Discography

Studio albums
 South Florida Mountains (2014)
 Errlirl (2016)
 Whole Tushie (2016)

Mixtapes
 Rara Aves (2011)
 Sonter Masic (2012)
 Peace Mettle (2012)
 Raindancin (in the Pussy) (2012)
 New World Whale (2012)
 Bright Side of the Moon (2013)

EPs
 All Fucked Up Everything (2011)
 Prostitutes' Yard Sale (2011) 
 Smuggler Songgs (2011) 
 PMB Ho! (2012) 
 Carbon Bros (2012) 
 Hashburry Gardens (2012) 
 Cloudlife (2012) 
 Cool Cool Summer (2012) 
 Adominable Flowmans (2012) 
 Fates' Book (2012)
 Sky Pants (2012) 
 All Fucked Up Everything Vol. 2 (2012)
 Mostly Power (2012)
 Mostly Peace (2012)
 Mindcrate #1: Tropical Unnerpant (2013)
 Swiss Zachary Robinson (2014)

Singles
 "Leftover Karma" (2011)
 "Deep Nile" (2011)
 "Ghost Pussy Money" (2012)
 "Freeda Peeple's Anthem" (2013)

Guest appearances
 Mishka & Rad Reef - "Hyperbolic Chamber Music" (2012)
 Droned Out Clone - "Desperate Time Shit" from Instrumental Institution Vol. 1 (2012)
 Sortahuman x Dizzy D - "Outerspace" from Animal House (2012)
 Freshgalaxy - "Californeattle" from World of Summer 2 (2012)
 Western Tink - "Welcome to Cap City" (2013)
 Noah23 - "Leopard Carpet" from Lotus Deities (2013)
 Mishka & Rad Reef - "Hyperbolic Chamber Music II" (2013)
 Noah23 - "Weight Up" from Street Astrology (2014)

Productions
 Sortahuman - "How You Really Feel" from Stonergang (2011)
 Left Leberra - "Ripd Dresses" from Bubble Quiet Dos Mil (2011)
 Noah23 - "Leopard Carpet" from Lotus Deities (2013)
 Noah23 - "Weight Up" from Street Astrology (2014)

Compilation appearances
 "Floridian Rapper. Mountain 5." on New No Wave (2013)
 "Chronoglades" on Mitsuda (2013)

References

External links
 Rad Reef on Bandcamp
 
 

Living people
1981 births
Alternative hip hop musicians
American hip hop record producers
Jewish American musicians
Jewish hip hop record producers
Jewish rappers
People from Broward County, Florida
21st-century American rappers
21st-century American Jews